Michael Anthony Montagano (born July 4, 1981) is an American business executive. He is the Chief Executive Officer and member of the board of directors of Kitchen United Inc., a portfolio company of Google Ventures (GV) and Fidelity Investments.  Previously, he was chief operating officer and chief financial officer for PowerFlex Systems, which was acquired by Fortune Global 100 company Electricite de France (ENXTPA:EDF). Additionally, Montagano practiced M&A and corporate finance law for one of the world's 50 largest law firms, Faegre Drinker LLP (then Baker & Daniels, LLP). He earned his MBA from the University of Chicago Booth School of Business, and JD from Indiana University School of Law.

Biography
Montagano is the Chief Executive Officer and a Member of the Board of Directors of Kitchen United, Inc. Prior to his role as CEO, Montagano served as Chief Financial Officer and Treasurer for the company, where he led capital formation initiatives securing institutional financing partners, Google Ventures, Fidelity Investments, and G Squared, as well as the major strategic partners, RXR Realty, DivcoWest, and Rich Product Corporation.

Montagano is a seasoned executive with extensive experience raising institutional funding, scaling and achieving exits for venture-backed companies. His background with capital markets range from institutional equity (venture capital and private equity) and debt financings to liquidity events through M&A and IPOs. Most recently, he shepherded PowerFlex Systems, a company founded at the California Institute of Technology, from seed-stage to acquisition by a Fortune Global 100, Electricite de France (ENXTPA:EDF). Steeped in the food-tech space, Montagano previously helped thousands of restaurants enhance their digital presence and online ordering capacity through an innovative venture-backed tech solution. Additionally, he currently sits on the Board of Directors for Dog Haus World-Wide, one of the country's fastest-growing national restaurant chains.

Prior to leading venture-backed companies, Montagano practiced M&A and corporate finance law for one of the world's 50 largest law firms, Faegre Drinker LLP (then Baker & Daniels, LLP), working primarily with large private equity firms. Before practicing law, he worked for the National Collegiate Athletic Association, Indiana Governor Joe Kernan, U.S. Congressman Tim Roemer and was the 2008 Democratic Nominee for Indiana’s Third Congressional District.

He received his Masters of Business Administration from the University of Chicago Booth School of Business and his Juris Doctor from Indiana University School of Law, where he was an executive editor of the law review and chief justice of the moot court society. Montagano was a 2005 recipient of the American Bar Association Award of Recognition for Excellence in Law. He earned his B.A. degree from DePauw University, where he majored in economics. He also studied economics at the University of London.

Montagano grew up in a restaurant family, anchored by an Italian restaurant and a neighborhood grocery store and butchery founded by his grandparents. Montagano resides in Pasadena, California with his wife, Dr. Bethany Montagano, and son, Joey.

2008 election
At the age of 27, Montagano was the Democratic nominee for U.S. Congress in Indiana's 3rd congressional district (see map) in the 2008 U.S. Congressional elections.  He was unable to unseat seven-term incumbent Representative Mark Souder, falling short by a margin of 43,384 votes. His campaign raised $854,429 in total contributions as one of the top funded challengers in the Country, but was outspent by Rep. Souder who raised $1,076,565.

Despite the outcome, Montagano gave Congressman Souder his toughest challenge for re-election in fourteen years in one of the Country’s most Republican Districts. According to Cook Political Report, the district has a Partisan Voter Index (PVI) of R+18, indicating a generic Republican outperforms a generic Democrat 68% to 32% (18% above 50%), a 36-point republican advantage. President George W. Bush carried the district in 2004 with 68% of the vote.

Montagano was considered by the Democratic Party to be one of the top 50 candidates in the Country, and was named to the Democratic Congressional Campaign Committee’s list of the top U.S. House of Representatives races in the Country, receiving Red-to-Blue designation.

He was endorsed and supported by U.S. Senator Evan Bayh, Indiana Governor Joe Kernan, a majority of Indiana’s Congressional Delegation (Congressmen Andre Carson, Pete Visclosky, Joe Donnelly, Baron Hill and Brad Ellsworth), and mayors in Indiana’s Third Congressional district (Mayors Tom Henry – Fort Wayne, Dick Moore - Elkhart, Alan Kauffman - Goshen, Dick Hickman - Angola, Jim Fleck - Columbia City, Steve Lueke – South Bend). He also generated the support of national politicians including, President Barack Obama, US House Speaker Nancy Pelosi, US House Majority Leader Steny Hoyer, and US House Majority Whip Jim Clyburn, and former Majority Whip and President of NYU John Brademas and over 100 other members of congress.  He was also endorsed by Esquire Magazine.

In the weeks before the election, state and national pundits predicted a very close finish, categorizing the race at “Toss Up” or “Leans Republican”, with polls at: 44% (Montagano) to 41% (Souder), 45% (Souder) and 40% (Montagano), and 50% (Souder) to 41% (Montagano).  In the end, Montagano was unable to overcome the strong Republican tilt of the district, carrying only 40% of the vote, with Souder being reelected with 55%.

References

External links
 
Campaign contributions from OpenSecrets.org

Living people
Alumni of the University of London
Indiana Democrats
DePauw University alumni
Indiana University alumni
1981 births
People from Bristol, Indiana